Stadionul Municipal is a multi-purpose stadium located near Crâng Park, in Buzău, Romania. It is currently used mostly for football matches and is the home ground of FC Buzău. The stadium was built between 1936–1942, on the initiative of Buzău mayor Stan Săraru. It underwent a major refurbishment between 1971 and 1976.  It was refurbished again in 2007 when it was transformed into an all-seater stadium.

See also
 List of football stadiums in Romania

References

Football venues in Romania
Buildings and structures in Buzău
Buzău
Multi-purpose stadiums in Romania